Jim Colbert (born c. 1948) is a former American football player and coach. He served as the head football coach at C. W. Post—now known as LIU Post—in Brookville, New York from 1980 to 1982, compiling a record of 15–16. Colbert attended Neshaminy High School in Langhorne, Pennsylvania and was the starting quarterback at the University of Delaware in 1970 before switching to wide receiver.  He was head football coach at Smyrna High School in Smyrna, Delaware from 1972 to 1975, tallying a mark of 30–21–1, before he was hired as the offensive coordinator at Davidson College in 1976.

References

Year of birth missing (living people)
1940s births
Living people
American football quarterbacks
American football wide receivers
Davidson Wildcats football coaches
Delaware Fightin' Blue Hens football players
LIU Post Pioneers football coaches
High school football coaches in Delaware
People from Langhorne, Pennsylvania
People from Levittown, Pennsylvania
Players of American football from Pennsylvania